Robert Tan is a physician, author and medical director. He has written and lectured extensively on aging and men's health issues including andropause. He is a pioneer in testosterone replacement therapy and effects on the brain.
 Dr. Tan was in UK to complete his studies in Geriatric Medicine at the Royal Postgraduate Medical School, Hammersmith Hospital. His further medical training was completed at Case Western Reserve University in Cleveland, Ohio. He is noted to be one of the rare physicians in the world to hold multiple board certifications in different countries (Australia, UK, US), and also an MBA. He is still in active clinical practice with more than 25 years experience and also founded the OPAL Medical Clinic, a unique center dedicated to wellness and men's health. He is Clinical Professor with University of Texas Houston & Associate Professor with Baylor College of Medicine and a board member of Men's Health Network. He has been elected to the Best Doctors in America for several consecutive years.

Books
Aging Men's Health- A Case Based Approach. Thieme Medical Publishers, New York, NY, 2005.  
The Andropause Mystery: unraveling truths about the male menopause. Amred Publishing, Houston, TX, 2001.  
Ook mannen worden ouder  Elmar Publishing, Netherlands, 2002. .

References

External links
New York Times article on men's health issues, including a controversial statement by Tan that "Men are the weaker sex" This won the New York Times quote of the day & appeared in blogs & newspapers around the world 
Washington Post article on call for gender specific medical research and public policy changes with comments by Tan 
Interview by Gulf News in Dubai, UAE 
Interview by Brazilian newspaper in Portuguese on Andropause 

1959 births
Living people
People from Houston
National University of Singapore alumni